The Municipality of Osilnica is a municipality in southern Slovenia. It gets its name from the largest settlement and seat of the municipality, Osilnica.

Settlements
In addition to the municipal seat of Osilnica, the municipality also includes the following settlements:

 Belica
 Bezgarji
 Bezgovica
 Bosljiva Loka
 Grintovec pri Osilnici
 Križmani
 Ložec
 Malinišče
 Mirtoviči
 Padovo pri Osilnici
 Papeži
 Podvrh
 Ribjek
 Sela
 Spodnji Čačič
 Strojiči
 Zgornji Čačič
 Žurge

References

External links
 
 Municipality of Osilnica on Geopedia
Municipality of Osilnica website

Osilnica